Celtic Dragons are a Welsh netball team based in Cardiff. Their senior team plays in the Netball Superleague. In 2005–06 they were founder members of the league. Their best performance in the Superleague came in 2013 when they finished as runners up to Team Bath. Playing as Celtic Flames, Dragons also played in the 2017 Netball New Zealand Super Club. Celtic Dragons main partners include the Welsh Netball Association, the Wales national netball team and Cardiff Metropolitan University.

History

Netball Superleague
Celtic Dragons were formed in 2005 and were named as the Wales franchise in the new Netball Superleague. Together with Brunel Hurricanes, Galleria Mavericks, Leeds Carnegie, Loughborough Lightning, Northern Thunder, Team Bath and Team Northumbria, Dragons were founder members of the league. Their best performance in the Superleague came in 2013 when they finished as runners up to Team Bath.

Celtic Flames
Playing as Celtic Flames, Celtic Dragons played in the 2017 Netball New Zealand Super Club. The Celtic Flames squad featured past and present Dragons players, including Chelsea Lewis and Nia Jones, and two guest players, Anna Thompson and Temalisi Fakahokotau of Mainland Tactix. Both were also New Zealand internationals. Flames finished in fifth place, ahead of all other invited international teams outside Australia and New Zealand.

Wales
Celtic Dragons work in partnership with both the Welsh Netball Association and the Wales national netball team. Melissa Hyndman, Trish Wilcox and Julie Hoornweg all served as joint head coach of both Dragons and Wales. At the 2018 Commonwealth Games eleven of the squad were Dragons players and the twelfth, Chelsea Lewis was a former player.

Senior finals

Netball Superleague Grand Finals

Home venue
 
Dragons play the majority of their home Netball Superleague games at Sport Wales National Centre in Sophia Gardens. They also train and play some home games at Cardiff Metropolitan University. They have also occasionally played home games at Wrexham Glyndŵr University and at Cwmbran Stadium.

Notable players

2023 Squad

Internationals

 Nia Jones
 Chelsea Lewis
 Nicola Lewis

 Lindsay Keable

 Adi Bolakoro
 Episake Kahatoka
 Afa Rusivakula

 Rebekah Robinson

Head coaches

Honours
Netball Superleague
Runners Up: 2013: 1

References

External links
 Celtic Dragons on Facebook
  Celtic Dragons on Twitter

 
Netball teams in Wales
Netball Superleague teams
Sport in Cardiff
Netball
2005 establishments in Wales
Sports clubs established in 2005